Juan José Llach (born February 7, 1944) is an Argentine economist and sociologist. He is Member of Pontifical Academy of Social Sciences since 1994 and of the national academies of Education since 2003 and Economics since 2007. He also served as Secretary of Economic Policy between December 1991 and August 1996 and Minister of Education of Argentina from December 1999 to October 2000 designated by president Fernando de la Rúa.

He was born in Buenos Aires and attended to high school at Colegio del Salvador. He earned a degree in Sociology at the Pontifical Catholic University of Argentina and then another degree in Economy at the University of Buenos Aires.

References

1977 births
Argentine ministers of education
University of Buenos Aires alumni
Living people